Cry of the Prophets is an album by the American blues musician Chris Thomas, released in 1990.

Production
The album was written and recorded in Austin, Texas. It was produced by Bruce Bromberg and Thomas.

Critical reception

The Chicago Tribune wrote that Thomas's "keening guitar solos never overstay their welcome and his lyrics brim with urgency." The Los Angeles Times deemed the album "a strange brew of deep soul, country blues, modern funk, Hendrix and Marley that falls somewhere between a more rockin’ Robert Cray and a Lenny Kravitz without the Lennonisms." Greil Marcus, in The Village Voice, praised the "deep soul guitar" and "deep soul crying," writing that "up against the likes of N.W.A., Thomas sounds pathetic—but also real." The Washington Post thought that Cry of the Prophets contained "some of the year's most pleasurable music," writing that it's "a groundbreaking fusion of '60s Southern soul singing, '70s rock 'n' roll guitar and '80s funk rhythms."

Track listing

References

External links
Discography

1990 albums
Blues albums by American artists
HighTone Records albums
Sire Records albums